The Fender Musical Instruments Corporation (FMIC, or simply Fender) is an American manufacturer of instruments and amplifiers. Fender produces acoustic guitars, bass amplifiers and public address equipment, however it is best known for its solid-body electric guitars and bass guitars, particularly the Stratocaster, Telecaster, Jaguar, Jazzmaster, Precision Bass, and the Jazz Bass. The company was founded in Fullerton, California by Clarence Leonidas "Leo" Fender in 1946. Its headquarters are in Los Angeles, California.

The FMIC is a privately held corporation, with Andy Mooney serving as the Chief Executive Officer (CEO). The company filed for an initial public offering in March 2012, but this was withdrawn five months later. In addition to its Los Angeles headquarters, Fender has manufacturing facilities in Corona, California (US) and Ensenada, Baja California (Mexico).

As of July 10, 2012, the majority shareholders of Fender were the private equity firm of Weston Presidio (43%), Japanese music distributors Yamano Music (14%) and Kanda Shokai (13%), and Servco Pacific (5%). In December 2012, TPG Growth (the middle market and growth equity investment platform of TPG Capital) and Servco Pacific took control of the company after acquiring the shares held by Weston Presidio. In January 2020, Servco Pacific became the majority owner after acquiring the shares of TPG Growth.

History

Origins
The company began as "Fender's Radio Service" in late 1938, in Fullerton, California. As a qualified electronics technician, Fender had repaired radios, phonographs, home audio amplifiers, public address systems and musical instrument amplifiers, all designs based on research developed and released to the public domain by Western Electric in the 1930s, using vacuum tubes for amplification. The business also sidelined in carrying records for sale and the rental of company-designed PA systems. Leo became intrigued by design flaws in contemporary musical instrument amplifiers and began building amplifiers based on his own designs or modifications to designs.

By the early 1940s, Leo Fender had entered into a partnership with Clayton Orr "Doc" Kauffman, and they formed the K & F Manufacturing Corp to design, manufacture, and market electric instruments and amplifiers. Production began in 1945 with Hawaiian lap steel guitars like the "Champion" (incorporating a patented pickup) and amplifiers, sold as sets. By the end of the year, Fender became convinced that manufacturing was more profitable than repair, and decided to concentrate on that business instead. Kauffman remained unconvinced, and he and Fender amicably parted ways by early 1946. At that point, Fender renamed the company the "Fender Electric Instrument Company". The service shop remained open until 1951, although Leo Fender did not personally supervise it after 1947.

Leo Fender's lap steel guitar made in 1946 for Noel Boggs was probably the very first product of the new company, bearing an early presentation of the cursive "big F" Fender logo.

In the late 1940s, Fender began to experiment with more conventional guitar designs. Early Broadcasters were plagued with issues; while Fender boasted the strength of the instrument's one-piece maple neck, early adopters lamented its tendency to bow in humid weather. Fender's reluctant addition of a metal truss rod into the necks of his guitars allowed for the much needed ability to fine-tune the instrument to the musician's specific needs. With the design of the Telecaster finalized, mass production began in 1950. The Telecaster's bolted-on neck allowed for the instrument's body and neck to be milled and finished separately, and for the final assembling to be done quickly and cheaply by unskilled workers.

In 1950, Fender introduced the first mass-produced solid-body electric guitar, the Telecaster ("Tele") (originally named the Broadcaster for two-pickup models and Esquire for single-pickup). Following its success, Fender created the first mass-produced electric bass, the Precision Bass (P-Bass). In August, 1954, Fender unveiled the Stratocaster ("Strat") guitar. With the Telecaster and Precision Bass having been on the market for some time, Leo Fender was able to incorporate input from working musicians into the Stratocaster's design.

In 1959, Fender released the Jazzmaster guitar. Like the Stratocaster before it, the Jazzmaster was a radical departure from previous guitar designs. The offset body, vibrato system and innovative electronics were designed to capture the Jazz guitar market which until then was dominated by acoustic guitars. Fender even promoted the Jazzmaster as a premium successor to the Stratocaster, an accolade it never fully achieved. Despite being shunned by the Jazz community, the guitar found a home in the growing surf rock music scene, one that would go on to influence the Jazzmaster's successor, the Jaguar in 1962.

Sale to CBS 
In 1965, Leo Fender sold his companies to the Columbia Broadcasting System (CBS) for $13 million ($ in  adjusted for inflation). This was almost two million more than they had paid for The New York Yankees a year before. CBS entered the musical instruments field by acquiring the Fender companies (Fender Sales, Inc., Fender Electric Instrument Company, Inc., Fender Acoustic Instrument Company, Inc., Fender-Rhodes, Inc., Terrafen, Inc., Clef-Tronix, Inc., Randall Publishing Co., Inc., and V.C. Squier Company), as well as Electro-Music Inc. (Leslie speakers), Rogers drums, Steinway pianos, Gemeinhardt flutes, Lyon & Healy harps, Rodgers (institutional) organs, and Gulbransen home organs.

The sale was taken as a positive development, considering CBS's ability to bring in money and personnel who acquired a large inventory of Fender parts and unassembled guitars that were assembled and put to market. However, the sale also led to a reduction of the quality of Fender's guitars while under the management of "cost-cutting" CBS. Several cosmetic changes occurred after 1965/1966, such as a larger headstock shape on certain guitars. Bound necks with block shaped position markers were introduced in 1966. A bolder black headstock logo, as well as a brushed aluminum face plate with blue or red labels (depending the model) for the guitar and bass amplifiers became standard features, starting in late 1968. These first "silverface" amps added an aluminium trim detail around the speaker baffle until 1970.

Other cosmetic changes included a new "tailless" Fender amp decal and a sparkling orange grillcloth on certain amplifiers in the mid-1970s. Regarding guitars, in mid-1971, the usual four-bolt neck joint was changed to one using only three bolts, and a second string tree for the two middle (G and D) strings was added in late 1972. These changes were said to have been made to save money: while it suited the new 'improved' micro-tilt adjustment of the neck (previously requiring neck removal and shimming), the "Bullet" truss rod system, and a 5-way pickup selector on most models, it also resulted in a greater propensity toward mechanical failure of the guitars.

During the CBS era, the company did introduce some new instrument and amplifier designs. The Fender Starcaster was particularly unusual because of its shallow, yet semi-hollow body design that still retained the traditional Fender bolt-on neck, albeit with a completely different headstock. The Starcaster also incorporated a new Humbucking pickup designed by Seth Lover, which became known as the Wide Range pickup. This pickup also gave rise to 3 new incarnations of the classic Telecaster: the Telecaster Custom, the Telecaster Deluxe and the Telecaster Thinline. Though more recent use by Jonny Greenwood of Radiohead has raised the Starcaster's profile, CBS-era instruments are generally much less coveted or collectable than the "pre-CBS" models created by Leo Fender prior to selling the Fender companies to CBS in 1965.

In 1981, CBS brought in new management: three executives, John McLaren, William “Bill” Schultz and Dan Smith. They were experienced in the music industry, having previously worked for Yamaha Musical Instruments. They needed to deal with quality control issues, so the Fender Fullerton plant was virtually shut down in order to revamp manufacturing. Fender was also struggling to fight against lower cost copycat guitars on the market. They needed to manufacture the guitars somewhere else, so decided to move production to Japan, where some of the copycat guitars were coming from, even working with those companies. On March 11, 1982, Fender Japan Ltd. was founded. 

In 1983, the Fender Stratocaster received a short-lived redesign including a single ("master") tone control, a bare-bones pickguard-mounted output jack, redesigned single-coil pickups, active electronics, and three push buttons for pickup selection (on the Elite Series). Additionally, previous models such as the Swinger (also known as Musiclander) and Custom (also known as Maverick) were perceived by some musicians as little more than attempts to squeeze profits out of factory stock. The so-called "pre-CBS cult" refers to the popularity of Fenders made before the sale.

After selling the Fender company, Leo Fender founded Music Man in 1975, and G&L Musical Instruments in 1979, both of which manufacture electric guitars and basses based on his later designs.

After CBS

In 1985, in a campaign initiated by then CBS Musical Instruments division president William Schultz (1926–2006), the Fender Electric Instrument Manufacturing Company employees purchased the company from CBS and renamed it "Fender Musical Instruments Corporation" (FMIC). The sale did not include the old Fullerton factory; FMIC had to build a new facility in nearby Corona. The vast majority of Fender guitars sold in 1985, were made in Japan.

In 1991, FMIC moved its corporate headquarters from its Corona location to Scottsdale, Arizona, where "administration, marketing, advertising, sales and export operations" take place, not only for the United States operations, but many other countries also. Fender guitars built in Ensenada, Mexico, now fulfill the primary export role formerly held by Japanese-made Fenders. The Japanese Fenders are now manufactured specifically for the Japanese market, with only a small number marked for export.

On February 11, 1994, the Ensenada plant burned down, and main production was temporarily moved to Corona.

By the late 1990s, the Ensenada plant was producing around 150,000 instruments per year with the Corona plant producing some 85,000.

Price fixing 

In January 2020, the company's UK arm, "Fender Europe", was fined £4.5 million after admitting resale price maintenance (a form of price-fixing) between 2013, and 2018, in breach of the United Kingdom's Competition Act 1998.

Logos

The Fender “spaghetti logo” was used by Fender from 1954 to the mid 1960s. By 1965 Fender used a transition logo which was a thicker gold-and-black logo (this logo is associated with CBS).

Acquisitions and partnerships 
FMIC has purchased a number of instrument brands and firms, including the Guild Guitar Company, the Sunn Amplifier Company, and SWR Sound Corporation. In early 2003, FMIC reached an agreement with the Gretsch family and began manufacturing and distributing new Gretsch guitars. Fender also owns Jackson, Olympia, Orpheum, Tacoma Guitars, Squier, and Brand X amps.

On October 28, 2007, Fender acquired Kaman Music Corporation, which owned the Ovation Guitar Company, Latin Percussion and Toca hand percussion products, Gibraltar Hardware, Genz Benz Amplification, Charvel, Hamer Guitars, and is the exclusive U.S. sales representative for Sabian Cymbals and exclusive worldwide distributor of Takamine Guitars and Gretsch Drums.

In 2011, Volkswagen partnered with Fender to manufacture premium sound systems for its vehicles in North America. Volkswagen vehicles in North America that offer optional Fender Premium Sound are the Volkswagen Golf, Volkswagen Beetle, Volkswagen Jetta Sedan, Volkswagen Passat, and Volkswagen Tiguan.

In February 2015, KMC was sold to Jam Industries by FMIC.

In January 2019, Fender purchased the Bigsby Electric Guitar Company from its partner Gretsch.The subsidiary operates independently, and produces the popular Bigsby vibrato tailpiece as well as several Paul Bigsby-designed electric guitars.

In November 2021, Fender purchased the Louisiana based PreSonus Audio Electronics, a manufacturer of professional audio equipment and software.

Publications

Fender Frontline
Fender published the Fender Frontline magazine as a source of product, artist and technical data for the company's customers. The first half featured interviews and articles about the guitars and the stars who played them, and the second half was a catalog section.

Fender published 27 issues of the magazine from 1990 through 2000. Notable interviewees included Kurt Cobain in Fall 1994, in what was his last interview. Fender had designed a hybrid guitar for Cobain, known as a Jag Stang. Other notable interviews featured Pink Floyd guitarist David Gilmour, Glenn Hughes from Deep Purple, and King Crimson's Adrian Belew.

In 2001, Fender eliminated the interviews and features section, and Frontline became an annual illustrated price list until 2006, when it was replaced with a product guide.

Product guide
Since February 2007, Fender produces an annual illustrated product guide in place of its traditional annual Frontline magazine. This change was made in large part due to costs associated with paying royalties for both print and the Internet. With the new illustrated product guide, this removed print issues. The new guide contains the entire range of instruments and amplifiers, with color pictures and basic specifications. These are available through guitar publications and are directly mailed to customers who sign up on the Fender website. As well as these printed formats, Fender Frontline Live launched at the winter NAMM show in January 2007 as a new online reference point, containing information on new products and live footage from the show.

Products

Fender's core product are electric guitars, namely the Jaguar, Jazzmaster, Mustang, Telecaster, and Stratocaster. This is alongside bass guitars in the Mustang, Jaguar, Jazz and Precision models. Fender also manufactures acoustic guitars, lap steel guitars, banjos, electric violins, guitar/bass amplifiers and the Fender Rhodes electric piano. In addition, Fender produces effects pedals and picks. 

According to American guitar expert George Gruhn, the Fender Telecaster, Precision Bass, and Stratocaster are "three of the most important models in the history of the electric guitar", and were all introduced between 1950 and 1957. In 1953, Fender also introduced the Stringmaster, a double-pickup model which was popular with western swing steel-guitar players.

Fender manufactures and distributes all musical instruments sold under the EVH brand, including Custom Shop models and replicas of the Frankenstrat.

Squier 

Squier was a string manufacturer that Fender acquired. Fender has used the Squier brand since 1982 to market inexpensive variants of Fender guitars to compete with Stratocaster copies, as the Stratocaster became more popular. Squier guitars have been manufactured in Japan, Korea, Mexico, India, Indonesia, China and the United States of America.

See also
Music Man
G&L Musical Instruments

References

External links

 
Leo Fender Exhibit , Permanent exhibit at the Fullerton Museum on the Fender company history in the city
NAMM Oral History Interview with William Schultz (2000)
NAMM Oral History Interview with Bill Mandello (2010)
NAMM Oral History Interview with Larry Thomas (2012)
Stratocaster Repair Log (2016)
Fender Guitars Database

 

1946 establishments in California
American companies established in 1946
Bass guitar manufacturing companies
Economy of Corona, California
Former CBS Corporation subsidiaries
Guitar amplifier manufacturers
Guitar manufacturing companies of the United States
Manufacturing companies based in Greater Los Angeles
Manufacturing in Riverside County, California
Manufacturing companies established in 1946
Private equity portfolio companies
TPG Capital companies
Harmonica manufacturers